Patrick Joseph Brennan (born 11 February 1986 in Brooklyn, New York, United States) is an American actor and singer. He is best known for his role as Doug Carter in the British television soap opera Hollyoaks. He originally played the role in online spin-off Hollyoaks: Freshers. He also appeared in Episodes.

Personal life
Brennan refers to himself as being "Irish-American" and was named after an Irish priest. He grew up practising Irish step-dancing. Brennan uses the name "P. J." which is often confused as being a stage name.

Brennan lived in his native United States for the first 21 years of his life before moving to the United Kingdom after graduating from Fordham University, settling in London in September 2007. Brennan attended the prestigious Catholic prep school Xavier High School in Manhattan. Brennan studied at the Central School of Speech and Drama where he completed a three-year degree. Brennan later moved to Liverpool and lived with some of his Hollyoaks cast members including Alice Barlow, Bianca Hendrickse-Spendlove and Jessica Forrest. Brennan is gay.

Career
Hollyoaks was Brennan's first role and he auditioned for the part in April 2010. Brennan's casting at Hollyoaks was announced on 15 July 2010.  Brennan initially had a guest role with the show and appeared from 13 September 2010 to 17 September when he left. Brennan was asked to return in October 2010. His return was announced on 14 December 2010. 2019 he is Nate Goldberg  in the TV series Tales of the City.

Filmography

Discography

Extended plays

References

External links

Living people
American people of Irish descent
American emigrants to England
American expatriates in England
American male television actors
Male actors from New York City
1986 births
American gay actors
People from Brooklyn
Xavier High School (New York City) alumni